The women's long jump at the 2012 IPC Athletics European Championships was held at Stadskanaal Stadium from 24–28 July.

Medalists
Results given by IPC Athletics.

Results

F11

F12

F13

F20

F37

F38

F42/44/46

See also
List of IPC world records in athletics

References

long jump
2012 in women's athletics
Long jump at the World Para Athletics European Championships